The 1891 Stowmarket by-election was held on 5 May 1891 after the death of the incumbent Conservative MP Edward Greene.  It was gained by the Liberal candidate Sydney Stern.

References

Stowmarket
1891 elections in the United Kingdom
1891 in England